The free market principle is not an Islamic principle. Islam considers commodities with intrinsic value as currency. The following are some examples of commodities that can be used as currency: gold (as Gold Dinar), silver (as Silver Dirham), dates, wheat, barley, and salt. The mentioned six items are derived from a hadith i.e gold, silver, dates, wheat, barley, and salt and were used as money in barter system. As the items mentioned in hadith, therefore, also known as Sunnah money.

Paper money or electronic money can be used as long as it is backed by one of these commodities at a fixed exchange rate (in other words the paper is just a contract stipulating that the bearer can redeem the paper for a fixed measure (weight) of that particular commodity). Until 1971, most currencies of the world were backed by gold. However, only governments could redeem paper, not the average citizen.

The price of a commodity is set by the market as long as fiat currency (paper) is not used. On the other hand, the price/value of commodities can be manipulated/adjusted by the creators of fiat money (by virtue of the market law of supply and demand).

References

Islam
Islamic culture